Jonathan David "JD" McPherson (born April 14, 1977), is an American singer-songwriter and guitarist from Broken Arrow, Oklahoma. He is known for a retro sound rooted in the rock and roll, rockabilly, and rhythm and blues music of the 1950s. Among influences such as Little Richard and Fats Domino, McPherson also draws inspiration from artists as diverse as the Wu-Tang Clan, Pixies, and Led Zeppelin.

Biography
McPherson was born as the youngest child in his family in rural southeastern Oklahoma, growing up on the family’s cattle ranch near the town of Talihina. His father was a farmer and ex-army, while his mother was a church minister. He took up the guitar at age 13. In high school, he played in a number of local punk rock bands and began writing his own songs. He has stated that he has always been in a band of some sort since he was 16 years old.

 

Of his youth growing up in a quiet rural area, he said that this allowed him to involve himself in the pursuit of music:

During this time, McPherson also developed a strong interest in 1950s rock and roll after being exposed to the music of Buddy Holly. This went on to shape his song writing and sound for bands he was in such as The Poison Okies and The Starkweather Boys.

He studied visual arts in college, earning a Master of Fine Arts from the University of Tulsa, and later worked as an art and technology teacher. McPherson taught middle school art for four years before embarking on a music career, later remarking that he loved teaching but did not enjoy the bureaucratic aspects of the job. As McPherson stated, "It feels like another life now... It taught me that I'm a terrible employee. I actually really enjoyed the teaching part of it, but wallowing in the mire of administrivia is not a thing I'm very good at."

After deciding to pursue music more seriously, McPherson sent a demo to Jimmy Sutton of the small independent record label Hi-STYLE Records, which specialized in roots music. Sutton agreed to produce McPherson's debut album, a process that ultimately led to 2010's Signs and Signifiers.
After its wider release through Rounder Records, Rolling Stone gave Signs and Signifiers a 3½ star (out of 5) review in November 2012 and labelled McPherson an "Artist to Watch."

In 2015, McPherson produced the album You're Dreaming by The Cactus Blossoms. The band played the acoustic stage at the Glastonbury Festival 2015 on Friday June 26, before continuing their European tour in the Netherlands.

In October 2015, JD McPherson and band appeared (in animated form) as musical guests performing a new and original song "Crazy Horse" for the DreamWorks animated TV series, The Mr. Peabody & Sherman Show on Netflix.

In June 2022, McPherson joined Robert Plant and Alison Krauss on their Raise the Roof tour, serving as both lead guitarist and opening act.

Discography

Albums

Signs & Signifiers
McPherson's debut album, Signs and Signifiers, was released in 2010 on Hi-STYLE Records. The album was given a major-label release by Rounder Records on April 17, 2012, debuting at number one on the Billboard Heatseekers Albums chart and number 161 on the Billboard 200 the week of June 2, 2012. It also reached number 47 on the Billboard Rock Albums chart.

The single "Your Love (All That I'm Missing)", from the album Signs and Signifiers, was released by Rounder/Hi-STYLE in the UK on June 18, 2012.

Let the Good Times Roll
McPherson's second album, Let the Good Times Roll, was released on February 10, 2015.

Undivided Heart and Soul
JD McPherson's third album, Undivided Heart and Soul, was released on October 6, 2017.
The song "Under the Spell of City Lights" is featured in the soundtrack of MLB The Show 18.

Socks
JD McPherson's fourth album, Socks, a holiday album, was released on November 2, 2018. In Matt Collar's AllMusic review, he asserted that the album is "a jubilantly rockin' production, rife with humor and the Oklahoma-born singer's knack for old-school '50s R&B."

Singles and EPs

The Warm Covers EP
The Warm Covers EP, an EP consisting of four cover versions of other artist's songs, was released on the 14th of October, 2014.

Music videos

Awards
Independent Music Awards 2012: Signs & Signifiers – Best Rock/Hard Rock Album

References

External links

JD McPherson at Hi-STYLE Records
 

1977 births
American rock musicians
American rockabilly musicians
Blues musicians from Oklahoma
Living people
Rock and roll musicians
People from Broken Arrow, Oklahoma
Rounder Records artists